Todopsis is a former genus of fly-catching wrens. The following species were formerly classified within the genus Todopsis:

 Wallace's fairywren (as Todopsis wallacii and Todopsis coronatus)
 Broad-billed fairywren (as Todopsis grayi)
 Emperor fairywren (as Todopsis cyanocephala)
 Emperor fairywren (mysorensis) (as Todopsis mysorensis)
 Emperor fairywren (bonapartii) (as Todopsis bonapartii)

References

Bird genera
Obsolete bird taxa
Taxa named by Charles Lucien Bonaparte